Gems of Divine Mysteries (Jawáhiru'l-Asrár) is a lengthy Arabic epistle by Baháʼu'lláh, the founder of the Baháʼí Faith. The tablet (as Baháʼu'lláh's works are often called) was written during his time in Baghdad (1853-1863) in Arabic, and was published in English in 2002.

Background
The work was written in reply to a question from Siyyid Yúsuf-i-Sidihí Isfahání, a religious leader of the Shiʻas in Najaf, who had asked the question of how the promised Mahdi could have been "transformed" (meaning: the return of the Promised One in a different human guise) into Ali-Muhammad the (Báb). The work was written on the same day as the question had been received and delivered through an intermediary.

According to a compilation published in 2000 by researchers at the Wilmette Institute, Siyyid Yúsuf-i-Sidihí Isfahání, who was residing in Karbila when the tablet was written, recognized the divinity of Baháʼu'lláh after reading the tablet. When he met Baháʼu'lláh later, he became a Babi. His friends rejected him for becoming a Babi and he could no longer stay in their home.

Contents

Baháʼu'lláh himself states that he took "the opportunity provided by" the question "to elaborate on a number of subjects". The introduction of the published English translation lists some of these topics, some of which are: "rejection of the Prophets of the past," "danger of a literal reading of scripture," "the meaning of the signs and portents of the Bible concerning the advent of the new Manifestation," "the continuity of divine revelation," "intimations of Baháʼu'lláh's approaching declaration," and the significance or meanings of terms such as "Day of Judgement" and "the Resurrection."

Similar themes as those presented in the Gems of Divine Mysteries can be found in the Seven Valleys and in the Kitáb-i-Íqán.

Translation
The governing body of the Baha'i Faith global community, the Universal House of Justice, announced in April 2001, as part of its ongoing five-year plan, that the Centre for the Study of the Texts —  at the Baháʼí World Centre — would "focus on translations into English from the Holy Texts." The publication of Gems of Divine Mysteries was one of the projects undertaken in fulfilment of that five-year plan.

See also
Jabulqa and Jabulsa

References

Further reading

External links
Baháʼí World News Service: New volume of Baha'i sacred writings is published
Compendium on Gems of Divine Mysteries

Works by Baháʼu'lláh
1850s books
1860s books